Milton, Wisconsin is a city in Rock County, Wisconsin.

Milton can also refer to:
Milton, Buffalo County, Wisconsin, a town
Milton, Rock County, Wisconsin, a town